Simmental may refer to:

 Simmental, an alpine valley in the Bernese Oberland of Switzerland;
 Simmental cattle, a versatile breed of cattle originating in the valley of the Simme River, in the Bernese Oberland of western Switzerland;
 French Simmental, a French cattle breed, closely related to the Simmental cattle;
 Simmental Fleckvieh, another name of the Fleckvieh cattle, closely related to the Simmental cattle.
 Simmenthal, a brand of canned meats.
The European Court of Justice ruling in Amministrazione delle Finanze dello Stato v Simmenthal SpA, March 1978, regarding the canned meat company.